The Alcantarilha River is a small river in the south central region of the Algarve, Portugal. The river begins at the conflux of three tributary streams a little south of the village of Miões in the municipality of Silves. Downstream the river also has several further tributaries including the Algoz River (Ribeiro de Algoz).

Description

The Armação de Pêra wetlands 
The river runs south towards the south coast and its mouth is at Armação de Pêra. At Armação de Pêra the river is the main tributary to an area of shallow salt marsh which over the years has been neglected and is polluted. Plans have been made to improve the environment in the near future as the wetlands are an important habitat for water fowl and a wintering and nesting site for a numerous species of birds. The wetland is also an important stopping point for thousands of migrating birds.

References 

Rivers of Portugal
Rivers of the Algarve